The TEOR (Transport Est-Ouest Rouennais) is a bus rapid transit system operating in the city of Rouen, Normandy, France. The service was inaugurated on February, 2001. TEOR was the second BRT system implemented in France (after Évry).

All three TEOR lines operate on separate bus lanes. It allows for a much faster and efficient public transportation network. TEOR vehicles are able to travel rapidly without encountering traffic problems.

The system is operated by TCAR (Transports en Commun de l'Agglomération Rouennaise), a subsidiary of Transdev.

Services

Line T1 
Mont-Saint-Aignan to Rouen

Line T2 
Notre-Dame-de-Bondeville to Bihorel

Line T3 
Canteleu to Darnétal

Line T4 
Grand-Quevilly to Rouen

Vehicles 

Each vehicle also has a GPS locator on board, which allows traffic signals to give the TEOR buses priority at busy intersections, keeping them moving as much as possible. Four doors on each side of the vehicle allow fast and easy boarding and exiting.

Optical guidance
The system is notable for its use of optical guidance of the vehicles at the stations.  Markings on the roadway and camera systems on the vehicles were used for docking.  However for many years the system was deactivated due to poor reliability arising from the sun, dirt, grease and oil build-up on the road diminishing the pavement markings' contrast, despite the system stated to work even if just one-third of the stripes are visible.  A similar optical system is used by the Autonomous Rail Rapid Transit system.

Irisbus Citelis 18 

The TEOR runs a fleet of 28 articulated Irisbus Citelis 18 manufactured by Irisbus, each with a seating capacity of 43 and able to accommodate 67 more standing. The vehicles run on a diesel motor system that produce less emissions than regular buses (Euro 3).

Stations 
TEOR stations are easily accessible for all users, including those with reduced mobility.

References 

Transport in Rouen
Bus transport in France